Aplocheilichthys sp. nov. 'Naivasha' was a  formally undescribed species of freshwater fish in the family Poeciliidae. It was endemic to Kenya, but went extinct.

Sources 

Aplocheilichthys
Endemic freshwater fish of Kenya
Undescribed vertebrate species
Taxonomy articles created by Polbot